Ariel Maximiliano Richeze Araquistain (born 7 March 1983) is an Argentine professional cyclist, who competed as a professional from 2006 until January 2023. Richeze won the silver medal at the 2015 Pan American Games (Men's Team Pursuit). His brothers Roberto, Mauro and Adrián are also cyclists.

Biography
Richeze was born in Bella Vista. In his first season as a professional racer, he obtained the second position in the last stage of the 2006 Giro d'Italia, finishing some centimetres behind Robert Förster.  He is considered to be the Argentine cyclist to obtain the best result in any of the three main cycling tours (the Giro d'Italia, the Tour de France and the Vuelta a España), since naturalised Lucien Petit-Breton raced for France, Argentina-born Juan Antonio Flecha raced for Spain, and Alejandro Borrajo only achieved a third place, also at the Giro.

In the 2007 Giro d'Italia Richeze placed 3rd on Stage 3 and 2nd on Stage 18 and 21, all of which were won by Alessandro Petacchi. But after the disqualification of Petacchi in May 2008 for doping, Richeze was declared the winner of stages 18 and 21 of that Giro.

Among his other achievements are the first position of Stage 1 and other second positions in the 2006 Tour de Langkawi in Malaysia, and the 2005 Trofeo Arvedi of the Circuito del Porto in Portugal. Also in 2005 he won the Panamerican under-23 Championship, and in 2003 he became the Argentine under-23 champion.

In 2010 he was granted the Konex Award Merit Diploma as one of the five best cyclist of the last decade in Argentina.

In October 2015, after spending 11 seasons riding professionally for Italian teams, Belgian squad  announced that Richeze would join them from 2016 on a two-year contract, with a role as a lead-out man for Marcel Kittel and Fernando Gaviria. After four years without a victory he won the fourth stage at the 2016 Tour de Suisse and also won the points classification for his new team.

Doping
Before the start of the 2008 Giro d'Italia Richeze tested positive for a steroid named stanozolol which resulted in his expulsion from the race. Despite being initially cleared by the Argentine Cycling Federation he was banned by the Court of Arbitration for Sport for two years.

Major results

2003
 1st  Kilo, National Track Championships
 2nd Overall Clásica del Oeste-Doble Bragado
1st Stage 6
2004
 Vuelta Ciclista Lider al Sur
1st Stages 2a & 4a
 1st Stage 2 Clásica del Oeste-Doble Bragado
2005
 1st  Road race, Pan American Under-23 Road Championships
 1st Circuito del Porto
 Clásica del Oeste-Doble Bragado
1st Stages 1 & 6b
 1st Stage 2 Giro del Veneto
 1st Stage 9 Vuelta a San Juan
 2nd Road race, National Under-23 Road Championships
 2nd Piccola Coppa Agostoni
 7th Gran Premio della Liberazione
2006
 1st Stage 1 Tour de Langkawi
2007
 1st Stage 1 Tour de Luxembourg
 1st Stage 2 Tour de Langkawi
 1st Stage 4 Giro del Trentino
 1st Stage 4 Vuelta a San Juan
 4th Grand Prix de Rennes
 5th Gran Premio Città di Misano – Adriatico
2008
 1st Stage 2 Tour de San Luis
 1st Stage 7 Tour of Turkey
 3rd Trofeo Laigueglia
 4th Giro di Toscana
 6th Giro del Piemonte
 7th Grand Prix de Rennes
 9th Overall Circuit de la Sarthe
1st Stage 5
2011
 Okolo Slovenska
1st  Points classification
1st Stages 1, 6 & 7
 4th Overall Tour de Kumano
1st Prologue
 5th GP Kranj
 6th Gran Premio della Costa Etruschi
2012
 1st  Road race, Pan American Road Championships
 1st  Overall Tour de Hokkaido
1st  Points classification
1st Stages 2 & 3
 Tour de Serbie
1st  Points classification
1st Stages 1, 5 & 6
 1st Stage 1 Tour of Japan
 3rd Overall Tour de Korea
 3rd Coppa Bernocchi
 4th Overall Giro della Provincia di Reggio Calabria
 5th Overall Tour de Kumano
1st  Points classification
1st Stage 1
 5th Gran Premio della Costa Etruschi
 8th Overall Vuelta a Venezuela
1st  Points classification
1st Stages 1, 7, 8 & 10
2013
 Pan American Track Championships
1st  Scratch
1st  Team pursuit
 1st Prologue Vuelta a San Juan
2015
 2nd  Team pursuit, Pan American Games
2016
 Tour de Suisse
1st  Points classification
1st Stage 4
 1st Stage 1 (TTT) Tour de San Luis
 2nd Eschborn-Frankfurt – Rund um den Finanzplatz
 3rd Grand Prix Impanis-Van Petegem
2017
 Vuelta a San Juan
1st Stages 6 & 7
 5th Paris–Tours
 6th EuroEyes Cyclassics
 8th Eschborn–Frankfurt – Rund um den Finanzplatz
2018
 1st Stage 1 Presidential Tour of Turkey
 1st Stage 4 Vuelta a San Juan
 2nd  Road race, Pan American Road Championships
2019
 1st  Road race, Pan American Games
 1st  Road race, National Road Championships

Grand Tour general classification results timeline

See also
 List of doping cases in cycling

References

External links
 
 
 
 
 
 
 

1983 births
Living people
Argentine male cyclists
Olympic cyclists of Argentina
Cyclists at the 2012 Summer Olympics
Cyclists at the 2016 Summer Olympics
Pan American Games gold medalists for Argentina
Pan American Games silver medalists for Argentina
Pan American Games medalists in cycling
Cyclists at the 2015 Pan American Games
Cyclists at the 2019 Pan American Games
Medalists at the 2015 Pan American Games
Medalists at the 2019 Pan American Games
Presidential Cycling Tour of Turkey stage winners
Tour de Suisse stage winners
Cyclists from Buenos Aires
Doping cases in cycling
Argentine sportspeople in doping cases
21st-century Argentine people